Moncarapacho is a former civil parish in the municipality of Olhão, Portugal. In 2013, the parish merged into the new parish Moncarapacho e Fuseta.

Main sites
Moncarapacho Church

References

Former parishes of Olhão